Bes (Bies, Bees, Beess) is a Polish coat of arms.

History

Gallery

Bibliography
 Tadeusz Gajl: Herbarz polski od średniowiecza do XX wieku : ponad 4500 herbów szlacheckich 37 tysięcy nazwisk 55 tysięcy rodów. L&L, 2007. .
 Samuel Orgelbrand: Encyklopedia Powszechna. Warszawa: 1898.
 Juliusz Karol Ostrowski: Księga herbowa rodów polskich. Warszawa: Główny skład Księgarnia Antykwarska B. Bolcewicza, 1897. T.1, str 33, T.2, str. 20

See also
 Polish heraldry
 Heraldic family
 List of Polish nobility coats of arms

External links 
 Bes i lista nazwisk w elektronicznej wersji Herbarza polskiego Tadeusza Gajla
 Herb Bes na www.jurzak.pl
 O śląskich korzeniach herbu Bees

Bes